The Sălbatica I Wind Farm is wind farm located in Tulcea County, Romania. It has 35 individual wind turbines with a nominal output of around 2 MW each and delivers up to 70 MW of power, enough to power over 66,000 homes, which required a capital investment of approximately US$100 million.

References

Wind farms in Romania